The Gurindji are an Aboriginal Australian people of northern Australia,  southwest of Katherine in the Northern Territory's Victoria River region.

Language and culture

Gurindji is one of the eastern Ngumbin languages, in the Ngumbin-Yapa subgroup of Pama-Nyungan languages. It is however characterised by a high level of adoption of loanwords from non Pama-Nyungan sources.

Gurindji Kriol is a mixed language, mostly spoken at Kalkaringi and Daguragu along with Gurindji and English.

Gurindji people share many similarities in language and culture with the neighbouring Warlpiri people. They also regard themselves as "one mob" with the Malngin, Bilinara, Mudburra and Ngarinyman peoples, referring to themselves as a group named Ngumpit, sharing "most of our languages and culture".

Among the Ngumpit, there are four skin names for boys, such as Janama and Japarta, and four for girls, such as Nangala and Nawurla. These are inherited at birth and kept for life, determining all of the people relate to each other.

Jurntakal (snake) is a major  Dreaming for the Gurindji, with this and other ancestor spirits keeping their traditional lands alive.

Art is the main occupation, with the Karungkarni Art and Cultural Centre the hub of artistic activity.

Ethnography
Important contributions to the study of the Gurindji were made by the young Japanese scholar Hokari Minoru (保苅実, 1971-2004) before his premature death. Hokari immersed himself in their narratives of the Gurindji experience of the white occupation of their land and, responsive to their complaints that whatever they had transmitted to outsiders ended up locked far away in Australian cities, always had them vet his writings. His primary informant was Jimmy Mangayarri.

Native title
The Gurindji people of the Northern Territory are best known for The Gurindji Strike, or Wave Hill walk-off, led by Vincent Lingiari in 1966, protesting against mistreatment by the station managers. The strike would become the first major victory of the Indigenous land rights movement. A small part of their traditional lands (roughly ), subsequently known as "Daguragu Station" was handed back to them in 1975 as a Northern Territory pastoral lease, by the then Australian prime minister, Gough Whitlam– paving the way for further land rights victories in Australia.

In 1984, after a hearing under the Aboriginal Land Rights Act 1976, and 1981 recommendations made by the original Aboriginal Commissioner, Justice John Toohey, they were granted inalienable freehold title to almost all of the area originally transferred back to them by Whitlam,  of their tribal land.  A final small portion of the Daguragu lease was recommended by the later Commissioner, Justice Maurice, in 1984. It wasn’t until May 1986 that the Hawke government finally handed over the  inalienable Aboriginal freehold title deeds to the Gurindji. Much of Wave Hill pastoral station (some ), however, remains in non-Indigenous hands.

Governance and economy

Two Gurindji communities are Kalkarindji (established by the NT Government as Wave Hill Welfare Settlement), a township of   located on the Buntine Highway, and Daguragu, a community settled on land under the Aboriginal Land Rights Act 1976.

Kalkarindji was gazetted as an open town in September 1976 (hence permits are not required for residents or visitors).

Permission from traditional owners, through the Central Land Council, is required to visit Daguragu. Daguragu became the first cattle station to be owned and managed by an Aboriginal community, the Murramulla Gurindji Company, after the Wave Hill walk-off. By the time the Gurindji eventually won ownership of Daguragu in 1986, there was little left of the economy. The bakery was destroyed by flooding in 2001. The Northern Territory Emergency Response ("The Intervention") put controls on people and made compulsory land acquisitions in 2007. Equipment and jobs went during a reorganisation of shires by the NT Labour government in 2008. 

Municipal and other services to both communities were provided by the Daguragu Community Government Council until 2008, when it was replaced by the Victoria Daly Shire, now called the Victoria Daly Region, which has a regional office for the ward of Kalkarindji/Daguragu located in Kalkarindji. The council services a number of outstations where traditional owners, belonging to the Gurindji language group, live. Some residents of Daguragu and Kalkarindji belong to other language groups, including the Warlpiri.

Following a successful native title claim over the township, traditional owners of Kalkaringi formed the Gurindji Aboriginal Corporation (GAC) in 2014, a Registered Native Title Body Corporate (RNTBC) owned by a total of about 700 people of mainly Gurindji, Mudburra and Warlpiri heritage. The underlying tenure remains with the government, but the GAC has powers to negotiate. It oversees a number of community-owned enterprises, such as the Kalkaringi Store and Caravan Park.

A 2016 news article about Daguragu described it as "starved, beat up and dying", after "half a century of government duplicity and over promising; bad local management and corporate naivety; land tenure bureaucracy and coercion". It has a creche and a successful Indigenous ranger program, but the hub of activity is at Kalkarindji. Here there is a school, a social club and other services. The traditional owner groups of the two communities do not have a smooth relationship.

Demographics
At the 2016 Australian census, the combined population of Daguragu/Kalkarindji was 575 people, of whom 517 (90.4%) identified as "Aboriginal and/or Torres Strait Islander people".

Surrounding locality

Freedom Day
On 23 August every year, a large celebration is held at Kalkarindji to mark the anniversary of the strike and walk-off. Known as Freedom Day, people gather from many parts of Australia to celebrate and re-enact the walk-off.

Alternative names
Norman Tindale lists the following names:
 Garundji
 Guirindji, Gurindji
 Koorangie
 Korindji

Notable people
 Vincent Lingiari
 Charlie King

See also
 Gurindji strike

Notes

Citations

Sources

Further reading
 Article by the author of the 2017 book A Handful of Sand: The Gurindji Struggle, After the Walk-off.

Hokari, Minoru (2011). Gurindji Journey: A Japanese Historian in the Outback. UNSW Press.

External links
 Daguragu Community Government Council

Aboriginal land rights in Australia
Aboriginal peoples of the Northern Territory